A Place of Our Own is a daily program about child care that airs on PBS, produced in Los Angeles by KCET. It was hosted by Debi Gutierrez and has been recently hosted by Elizabeth Sanchez. The Spanish-language version is Los Niños en Su Casa ("Our Children at Home"), seen on PBS and on the Spanish-language public television network V-me. Their version is hosted by Alina Rosario.

The show was produced by KCET in association with Sesame Workshop and 44 Blue Productions.

The tagline is "You are your child's first teacher".

Friday editions feature a "Week in Review", about the daily week, Monday-Thursday, similar to the review on Learn to Read. As is, people send letters to KCET, or email to Debi Gutierrez/Elizabeth Sanchez of A Place of Our Own or Alina Rosario of Los Niños en Su Casa.

It won a Peabody Award in 2005.

DVD release
Between 2008 and 2009, PBS Home Video began releasing A Place of Our Own on DVD.

 Early Childhood Solutions: Early Academics (June 24, 2008)
 Early Childhood Solutions: Health and Nutrition (November 18, 2008)
 Early Childhood Solutions: Special Needs (February 24, 2009)

External links
A Place of Our Own website
Los Niños en Su Casa website
44 Blue Productions website

PBS original programming
Television series by Sesame Workshop
1998 American television series debuts
2011 American television series endings
1990s American television series
2000s American television series
2010s American television series
Adult education television series
Parenting television series